Unavoidable is an album by Daniel Lee Chee Hun.

Unavoidable may also refer to:
"Unavoidable", a song by Dear Jane
Unavoidable EP, by Killing Time

See also
 Unavoidable Girl, a Vietnamese television series
 Unavoidable pattern, a formal pattern which occurs in all sufficiently long strings of symbols